The following is a list of Michigan State Historic Sites in Alpena County, Michigan. Sites marked with a dagger (†) are also listed on the National Register of Historic Places in Alpena County, Michigan.


Current listings

See also
 National Register of Historic Places listings in Alpena County, Michigan

Sources
 Historic Sites Online – Alpena County. Michigan State Housing Developmental Authority. Accessed January 23, 2011.

References

Alpena County
State Historic Sites
Tourist attractions in Alpena County, Michigan